Trees of Light is a jazz studio album by the Swedish-Japanese collaboration between Anders Jormin, Lena Willemark and Karin Nakagawa. This jazz album was released in ECM Records label in March 2015.

Reception
John Kelman in All About Jazz gave a four and a half stars to this album and says that "While there are moments of frenetic activity, the overall aesthetic of the album is one of space and the allowance for every instrument to occupy its own layer without ever getting in the way of the others."In The Jazz Breakfast, Peter Bacon says that Trees of Light is "a gorgeous album" and that "The trio ebbs and flows, breathes and sighs, weaves in and out with a grace and energy as natural as the sea on the shore or the wind in the trees."

Track listing
ECM – ECM 2406.

Personnel
Anders Jormin – double bass
Lena Willemark – voice, fiddle, viola
Karin Nakagawa – 25-string koto

References

ECM Records albums
2015 albums
Albums produced by Manfred Eicher